is a Japanese  comedian, entertainer, and actress represented by Ishii-Mitsuzo Office.

Filmography

Current TV appearances

Guest appearances

Stage

Former appearances

Dramas

References

External links
 

Japanese women comedians
Japanese actresses
1964 births
People from Mie Prefecture
Living people